The National Criminal Intelligence Sharing Plan (NCISP) is an intelligence-sharing initiative that links the computer databases of local, state, regional, tribal law enforcement agencies with those of the U.S. federal government.

See also
 Automated Trusted Information Exchange
 Homeland Security Information Network
 Joint Regional Information Exchange System
 Multistate Anti-Terrorism Information Exchange
 Regional Information Sharing Systems
 Surveillance

References

Surveillance